, formerly known as VIP, is a Japanese adult video company with headquarters in Tokyo, Japan.

Company information

VIP
The AV company  was founded in June 1981 and issued its first video, titled , in December of that same year making it one of the first adult video companies to be established in Japan. The studio continued production in 1982 with works that included S&M and scatological themes. By 1985, the studio was using actresses with some background in entertainment, such as Anri Inoue (井上あんり) who made her AV debut with VIP in August 1985 with the video .

The major event in the company's history in the 1980s was the debut of Hitomi Kobayashi in 1986 in her video Forbidden Relationship. With her style and looks, Kobayashi was a major factor in bringing in the concept of the AV Idol to the fledgling Japanese adult video industry, and, as the "AV Queen", she brought outstanding sales to VIP. In February 1987, Nao Saejima debuted with the company. Another early star for VIP was Rui Sakuragi, who made her debut in April 1989 under the name Masako Ichinose but took the name Rui Sakuragi the following year.

Stella / Atlas21
In January 1990, a new AV company, was formed as a subsidiary to VIP and, four years later in May 1994, the company's name was changed from Stella to Atlas21. By July of that year, the company had undergone a major reorganization, and the VIP company name and label were dropped in favor of the Atlas21 name and Atlas label. Two new labels, "OZ" and "SAURS", were also introduced as part of the newly named Atlas21 studio.

Sometime before 1997, Atlas21 joined with the Kuki group of companies, which, in addition to Kuki, comprised Alice Japan, Max-A, Media Station (Cosmos Plan), Big Morkal and Sexia. They were, at one time, the largest family of AV companies in Japan. Along with the other companies in the Kuki group, Atlas21 belonged to the voluntary ethics organization called (in English) the Nihon Ethics of Video Association (NEVA) or (in Japanese) 日本ビデオ倫理協会 (Nippon Bideo Rinri Kyoukai or Japan Video Morality Association), usually abbreviated as ビデ倫 (Biderin or Viderin). Prominent AV actresses who appeared in Atlas21 videos in the late 1990s included Asami Jō, Jun Kusanagi, Yuri Komuro, Madoka Ozawa and Bunko Kanazawa.

Recent history
In August 1998, the company revived the VIP name as a separate subsidiary company, . In addition to earlier Atlas21 AV stars Ai Kurosawa and Bunko Kanazawa, the new VIP also featured such actresses as Akira Watase, Nao Oikawa, Naho Ozawa and Riko Tachibana.

In 2005, the Atlas21 company reported capital of 13 million yen (about $130,000USD), and it had 11 employees. Both Atlas21 and VIP ceased production of new adult video products in December 2006. From its official website, the company gives access to another site which offers downloads of many of the early classic videos produced by the company, including works by Hitomi Kobayashi, Rui Sakuragi and Ai Iijima.

Labels
Atlas21

In addition to the Atlas label, the studio also used:
Gaia
Oz
Saurs
VIP

In addition to the VIP label, the following were also used:
Chao
God
Ribon

Directors
Noted directors who have worked for VIP or Atlas21:

 Kunihiro Hasegawa
 Katsuyuki Hirano
 Masato Ishioka
 Kei Morikawa
 Yukihiko Shimamura
 Akira Takatsuki

Actresses
A selected list of some of the actresses who have appeared in videos for VIP and Atlas21:

 Hotaru Akane
 Minori Aoi
 Ami Ayukawa
 Mari Ayukawa
 Ai Iijima
 Asami Jō
 Bunko Kanazawa
 Sakurako Kaoru
 Mariko Kawana
 Hitomi Kobayashi
 Yuri Komuro
 Aika Miura
 Ran Monbu
 Nozomi Momoi
 Kyoko Nakajima
 Nao Oikawa
 Nao Saejima
 Rui Sakuragi
 Riko Tachibana
 Akira Watase
 Maria Yumeno

Series
Some popular series produced by Atlas21 and VIP:

Atlas21

Cos-Para
Home Delivery Soapland 
The Call Girl 
The Neo Uniform Connection 
The Uniform Connection 
Violent Lips 

VIP
Crime and Punishment 
The Uniform Connection

Notes

Sources
 
 

Japanese pornographic film studios
Film production companies of Japan
Mass media companies based in Tokyo
Mass media companies established in 1981
1981 establishments in Japan